Lake Kutubu Rural LLG is a local-level government (LLG) of Southern Highlands Province, Papua New Guinea. Kutubuan languages are spoken in the LLG.

Lake Kutubu is located within the LLG.

Wards
01. Dugubali
02. Gena'abo
03. Damayu
04. Irika
05. Harabiyu
06. Herebo
07. Inu
08. Gesege
09. Iorogobayu
10. Manu/Ward
11. Gobe
12. Hidinihia
13. Fiwaga
14. Tugiri
15. Kafa
16. Yalanda
17. Sisibia
18. Baguale

References

Local-level governments of Southern Highlands Province